() is the administrative centre of Kautokeino Municipality in Troms og Finnmark county, Norway.

The village is the site of Kautokeino Church.

The European route E45 runs through the village on its way from the town of Alta as it heads south.  The small Kautokeino Airport lies just to the north of the village.  Sámi University College is also located in the village.

History
In 1852, the village was the site of the Kautokeino rebellion.

From 1882 to 1883 Sophus Tromholt ran a Northern Lights observatory here as a part of the first international polar year. He did not succeed in photographic recording of the Northern Lights, but used the camera to photograph landscapes, buildings and people. He was the first to photograph Kautokeino's Sami as character portraits with full names, not as tourist props or race examples. The Tromholt Collection became part of Unesco's Norwegian document heritage register in 2012, according to a display integrated with the facade of Stein Rokkan Building at the University of Bergen. Kautokeino is used as a setting in TV drama Outlier (2020).

References

Villages in Finnmark
Kautokeino
Populated places of Arctic Norway